In mathematics, in the field of  differential geometry, an Iwasawa manifold is a compact quotient of a 3-dimensional complex Heisenberg group by a cocompact, discrete subgroup.  An 
Iwasawa manifold is a nilmanifold, of real dimension 6.

Iwasawa manifolds give examples where the first two terms E1 and E2 of the Frölicher spectral sequence are not isomorphic. 

As a complex manifold, such an Iwasawa manifold is an important example of
a compact complex manifold which does not admit any Kähler metric.

References 

 .
 

Differential geometry
Lie groups
Homogeneous spaces
Complex manifolds